Farmer Not So John is the self-titled debut album from the band Farmer Not So John released in 1997. The albums was recorded at Recorded at Monkey Finger Studios in Nashville, Tennessee.

Track listing
 "Fire in the Valley" (Mack Linebaugh) – 3:53 
 "Rusty Weathervane" (Brian Ray) – 4:12
 "Every Street in Nashville" (Linebaugh) – 4:17
 "Of Angels" (Linebaugh, Ray) – 4:36
 "Fool's Lullaby"
 "Paperweight of the World" (Ray) – 3:19
 "The Hole We're In" (Linebaugh) – 4:40
 "Cradled" (Linebaugh, Ray) – 4:06
 "Sacred Cow" (Sean Keith, Linebaugh, Richard McLaurin, Ray) – 4:57
 "This Is Our House" (Linebaugh) – 4:17
 "Travelin' Fool" (Linebaugh) – 5:07

Personnel
Farmer Not So John
Mack Linebaugh – vocals, electric and acoustic guitar
Brian Ray – bass, vocals
Richard McLaurin – electric and acoustic guitar, lap steel guitar, dobro, mandolin, octave mandolin, organ, percussion, vocals
Sean R. Keith – drums

Additional personnel
 Sean Ray – pedal steel guitar
Jerry Dale McFadden – accordion
Steve Conn, Kris Kerr – organ
 Emmylou Truitt – bark

References 
1997 albums
Farmer Not So John albums